Beautiful: The Remix Album is a remix album of recordings by American band Blondie, released by Chrysalis/EMI Records in the UK during 1995. Several remix singles were released from the album in various formats: "Atomic" '94, which reached number 19 in the UK Singles Chart the previous year, "Heart of Glass" '95, which reached number 15, and "Union City Blue" '95 which reached number 31. 

The album was re-released by Dutch budget label Disky in 1999.

Track listing

Personnel
 Original producer: Mike Chapman (tracks 1–5, 7–12), Giorgio Moroder (track 6)
"Union City Blue" (Diddy's Power and Passion Mix):
 Engineer – Andy Allder
"Dreaming" (Utah Saints Mix):
 Engineer (mix engineer) – Guy Hatton
"Call Me" (Debbie Does Dallas):
 Programmer, engineer (remix engineer) – Mick Shiner
"Atomic" (Diddy's 12" Mix):
 Engineer – Republica
"The Tide Is High" (Sand Dollar Mix):
 Engineer, mixer – Guido Osorio
"Hanging on the Telephone" (Nose Bleed Handbag Mix):
 Programmer, engineer (remix engineer) – Mick Shiner
"Dreaming" (The Sub-Urban Dream Mix):
 Engineer (Co-engineered), mixed by (co-mixed by) – Matthias Heilbronn
 Keyboards – Mac Quayle

Charts

References

1995 remix albums
Chrysalis Records remix albums
Blondie (band) compilation albums
EMI Records remix albums